The men's 110 metres hurdles event at the 1936 Summer Olympic Games took place on August 5 and August 6. Thirty-one athletes from 20 nations competed. The maximum number of athletes per nation had been set at 3 since the 1930 Olympic Congress. The final was won by American Forrest Towns. It was the second of nine consecutive American victories, and the eighth overall gold medal for the United States in the 110 metres hurdles. Don Finlay of Great Britain became the second man to win two medals in the event.

Background

This was the tenth appearance of the event, which is one of 12 athletics events to have been held at every Summer Olympics. Two finalists from 1932 returned: bronze medalist Don Finlay of Great Britain and Willi Welscher of Germany, who had been disqualified in the final in Los Angeles. Forrest Towns and Fritz Pollard, Jr. of the United States were the favorites; Towns had set the world record at 14.1 seconds.

The Republic of China, the Philippines, and Yugoslavia each made their first appearance in the event. The United States made its tenth appearance, the only nation to have competed in the 110 metres hurdles in each Games to that point.

Competition format

The competition used the three-round basic format introduced in 1908. The first round consisted of six heats, with 5 or 6 hurdlers each. The top two hurdlers in each heat advanced to the semifinals. The 12 semifinalists were divided into two semifinals of 6 hurdlers each; the top three hurdlers in each advanced to the 6-man final.

Records

These were the standing world and Olympic records (in seconds) prior to the 1936 Summer Olympics.

Forrest Towns matched his own world record in the first semifinal, lowering the Olympic record by 0.3 seconds in doing so.

Schedule

The semifinals were held on the day of the final instead of the day of the first round.

Results

Heats

The fastest two runners in each of the six heats advanced to the semifinal round.

Heat 1

Heat 2

Heat 3

Heat 4

Heat 5

Heat 6

Semifinals

The fastest three runners in each of the two heats advanced to the final round.

Semifinal 1

Heat 2

Final

Pollard led early. Towns caught him at the third hurdle, going on to win "quite easily." Finlay finished strong, just passing Pollard at the end.

References

Athletics at the 1936 Summer Olympics
Sprint hurdles at the Olympics
Men's events at the 1936 Summer Olympics